Notre Dame High School is a private, Catholic high school in Crowley, Louisiana.  It was formed in 1967 by consolidating the three Catholic high schools in Acadia Parish; St. Michael of Crowley, St. Joseph of Rayne, and St. Francis of Iota.  It is located in the Roman Catholic Diocese of Lafayette.

Notre Dame's shield
Notre Dame's shield symbolizes the three principal Catholic ethnic groups which originally settled the area of Acadia: The German people are symbolized by the heraldic eagle, displayed with wings and outstretched legs; the Lebanese are represented by the Lebanon Cedar; and the Fleur-de-lis (or white lily), a religious symbol, is the national symbol of France.

History 
Notre Dame High School of Acadia Parish began its operation as a Catholic, co-educational school for students in grades 9–12 in September 1967. It was formed by consolidating the three Catholic high schools in Acadia Parish; Saint Michael in Crowley, Saint Joseph in Rayne, and Saint Francis in Iota. At the time of consolidation it was decided that the facilities of St. Michael be used until Notre Dame could build its own facility or make some other arrangements. On January 31, 1977, the Notre Dame School Board of Directors and seven church parishes purchased proportionate shares of Notre Dame from St. Michael Parish thus giving Notre Dame a permanent home.

Preceding the consolidation, committees under the direction of Father Robert Sibille, composed of faculty members and students from all three schools, met and selected possible uniforms, school colors, mascots, emblems and size. A school philosophy was written and curriculum and faculty began to take shape.

The Catholic Church parishes actively participating in the government of the school are: St. Michael, Crowley; St. Joseph, Rayne; St. Francis, Iota; Immaculate Heart of Mary, Crowley; St. Lawrence, Mowata; St. Leo IV, Roberts Cove; St. John the Baptist, Lyons Point; and Immaculate Conception, Morse. Each church parish provides leadership in the government of the school and each financially subsidizes the school based on the number of students who attend the school from the parish. Board members are elected lay people from each parish and a priest-chancellor who represents the pastors of the eight church parishes.

Notre Dame is accredited by Southern Association of Colleges and Schools (SACS), the Louisiana State Board of Education, and it is a diocesan school under the direction of the Office of Catholic Schools of the Diocese of Lafayette. The school undergoes periodic professional self-study under the direction of the Diocesan School Board's professional staff and the SACS accreditation team.

The meaning of Notre Dame 
"Notre Dame" is French for Our Lady. Mary, the Mother of Christ is the patroness of the school, and her statue stands in the center of the campus.

Athletics 
Notre Dame High athletics competes in the LHSAA.

Championships 
The Notre Dame football program has won six state championships in 1973, 1976, 2000, 2009, 2015​, and 2018.  

Non-football state championships include: men's baseball, women's softball, men's tennis, men's track & field, and women's volleyball.

Notable alumni 
 Tommy Casanova (Born 1950), former NFL player, politician
 Chris John (Born 1960), former Louisiana and U.S. Representative
 Tyler Shelvin (Born 1998), current NFL player
 Tony Robichaux (1961–2019), former head baseball coach at McNeese State University and University of Louisiana at Lafayette
 Barack Obama (Born 1961), former U.S president,politician

Notes and references

External links 
Notre Dame's Official Website

Catholic secondary schools in Louisiana
Schools in Acadia Parish, Louisiana
Educational institutions established in 1967
Crowley, Louisiana
1967 establishments in Louisiana